The 1500-metre run became a standard racing distance in Europe in the late 19th century, perhaps as a metric version of the mile, a popular running distance since at least the 1850s in English-speaking countries.

A distance of 1500 m sometimes is called the "metric mile". The French had the first important races over the distance, holding their initial championship in 1888.

When the Olympic Games were revived in 1896, metric distances were run, including the 1500; however, most of the best milers in the world were absent, and the winning time of 4:33 1/5 by Australian Edwin Flack was 17 4/5 seconds slower than the amateur mile record, despite the fact one mile is 109.344 metres longer than 1500 metres.

The 1900 Olympics and 1904 Olympics showed improvements in times run, but it was not until the 1908 Olympics that a meeting of the top milers over the distance took place, and not until the 1912 Olympics that a true world-class race over the distance was run.

The distance has now almost completely replaced the mile in major track meets.

Men (outdoors)

Pre-IAAF

IAAF era

The first world record in the 1500 m for men (athletics) was recognized by the International Amateur Athletics Federation, now known as World Athletics, in 1912.

To July 17, 2015, the IAAF has ratified 38 world records in the event.

The "Time" column indicates the ratified mark; the "Auto" column indicates a fully automatic time that was also recorded in the event when hand-timed marks were used for official records, or which was the basis for the official mark, rounded to the 10th of a second, depending on the rules then in place.

Auto times to the hundredth of a second were accepted by the IAAF for events up to and including 10,000 m from 1981. Hence, Steve Ovett's record at 3:31.4 was rendered as 3:31.36 from that year.

Women (outdoors)

Pre-IAAF

IAAF era

The first world record in the 1,500 m for women (athletics) was recognized by the International Amateur Athletics Federation, now known as World Athletics, in 1967.

To June 21, 2009, the IAAF has ratified 13 world records in the event.

+ - En route time during mile race.

The "Time" column indicates the ratified mark; the "Auto" column indicates a fully automatic time that was also recorded in the event when hand-timed marks were used for official records, or which was the basis for the official mark, rounded to the 10th of a second, depending on the rules then in place.

The IAAF accepted records to the hundredth of a second starting in 1981.

References
General
Women's record progression
Men's record progression
Specific

Further reading
Cordner Nelson and Roberto Quercetani, The Milers, Tafnews Press, 1985, 

1500 metres
World record 1500 metres